Natalia Eduardovna Grigorieva-Litvinskaya (born October 1, 1970) is a founder and Chief Curator of The Lumiere Gallery (2001) – the first Russian photography gallery, aimed at encouraging promotion and sales of the finest Russian and European photographs in Moscow.

In 2010, Natalia founded the Lumiere Brothers Center for Photography. The Museum's exhibition program aims to provide a broad perspective on photography with a special emphasis on Russian 20th century artists. The program has been built around the center's collection and collaborations with contemporary photographers and private collectors.

In April 2021 Natalia opened the Lumiere Gallery's new venue in Moscow on Bolshaya Polyanka.

Life and work 
In 1995, Natalia Grigorieva graduated from Moscow Aviation Institute; in 1998 - from International University in Moscow; In 2001, Natalia, together with her husband, Eduard Litvinsky, opened Lumiere Brothers Gallery at the Center House of Artists – first photography gallery in Russia.

For the past 19 years the gallery has amassed a vast collection of prints featuring chef d’oeuvres by renowned Soviet and the World famous artists: Alexander Rodchenko, Antanas Sutkus, Yakov Khalip, Vladimir Lagrange, Arnold Newman, Wynn Bullock, Ruth Orkin, Elliott Erwitt, Steve Schapiro, Guy Bourdin, Vivian Maier, Sabine Weiss, Harry Benson, Sheila Metzner, Miles Aldridge.

In 2010, Natalia and Eduard founded the Lumiere Brothers Center for Photography, private exhibition organization,  presenting an in-depth look into Russian 20th century photography and highlighting acclaimed and emerging foreign artists.

The Center possesses one of the largest collections of the 20th century Russian photography in the world spanning from Pictorialism and Avant-garde of the early 20th century through Socialist Realism of the 1930s and photojournalism and artistic photography of the 1960s – 1970s to underground movements of the 1980s – 1990s and contemporary art.

With over 19 years of experience in the field Natalia has been actively involved in developing photography market in Russia and establishing cross-cultural relations. For the last few years Natalia has closely worked with American, European and Asian artists, including recent participation as a portfolio reviewer at Lianzhou FotoFest 2015 and FotoFest Houston 2016.

For the last 5 years Natalia has curated over 70 exhibitions, including:

 The Soviet photography 60-70: Yuri Abramochkin, Lev Borodulin, Igor Gnevashev, Naum Granovsky, Yakov Khalip, Vladimir Lagrange
 The Phenomenon of the Lithuanian photography school: Antanas Sutkus, Vitalijus Butyrinas, Aleksandras Macijauskas
 Josef Koudelka. Invasion 68: Prague
 Ruth Orkin. Retrospective
 Steve Schapiro. Living America
 Vivian Maier. Riddle
 Arno Rafael Minkkinen. Retrospective
 Arnold Newman. Portraits and Abstractions
 Sabine Weiss. Hommage à Sabine
 Elliott Erwitt. Elliott Erwitt's Kolor at Red October
 Robert Whitman. Mikhail Baryshnikov
 Giovanni Gastel. Canons of Beauty
 Ezra Stoller. Pioneers of American Modernism
 Sheila Metzner. The Magic Of Metzner
 Harry Benson. The Beatles and more
 Miles Aldridge. Taste of colour
 Alexander Rodchenko. From the Still Art Foundation Collection
 Guy Bourdin. Follow me

Having organized a number of monographic exhibitions of foreign artists, the Center aims to expand its international program by creating conceptual exhibitions that would become a meeting ground for works produced by different artists and covering various countries and periods.

Starting from 2017, Natalia is curating Moscow's first international contemporary photography and photobook festival PHOTOBOOKFEST. The focus of the festival is the issues of actual documentary and art photography, the transformation of the photographic image in post-digital time, alternative models of art and media markets.

Publishing programme 
Natalia is also curating a major research project of the Center - The Anthology of Russian Photography of the XX Century. Publications result from research activities and accompany the major projects of the Lumiere:
Photo 60–70. Moscow: The Lumiere Brothers Center for Photography. 2008. .
Moscow of Naum Granovsky. Moscow: The Lumiere Brothers Center for Photography. 2009. .
Icons of the 1960s-1980s. Moscow: The Lumiere Brothers Center for Photography. 2010. .
Icons of the 1990s. Moscow: The Lumiere Brothers Center for Photography. 2011. .
Soviet era by Markov-Grinberg. Moscow: The Lumiere Brothers Center for Photography / Damiani. 2012. .
Time of the Little Bells. Moscow: The Lumiere Brothers Center for Photography. 2013. .
The Moscow Stories. Twentieth century. Moscow: The Lumiere Brothers Center for Photography. 2013. .
PROzavod. Industrial photography. The twentieth century. Moscow: The Lumiere Brothers Center for Photography. 2014. .
The Conquest. Yakov Khalip, Heir to the Russian Avant-Garde. Moscow: The Lumiere Brothers Center for Photography. 2016. .

References

External links
 «The Lumiere Center for Photography» The Official Website.
 «Photography, propaganda, and the search for truth How Soviet photography changed over the course of 50 years» — Meduza, 2015.
 «Seven decades of Soviet photography – in pictures» — The Guardian, 2015.
 «The Rich History of Soviet Photography, Told in 18 Images» — Wired, 2015.
 «Sebastian Copeland: “I’ve Been Attacked by Polar Bears a Few Times”» — Bird in Flight, 2018.
 «Memorable monuments to American modernism – in pictures» — The Guardian, 2018.
 «The Lumiere Brothers – Photo Exhibitions» — The Moscow Times, 2019.
 «The Iconic Photography of Guy Bourdin Now in a Moscow Survey» — Widewalls, 2020.

1970 births
Living people
Curators from Moscow
Russian  women curators
Photography in Russia